Martin Keith Williams (born 12 July 1973 in Luton, England) is a former professional football striker, most famously for Reading. Whilst at Reading he played on loan for Irish Football League side Bangor F.C. He played for Windsor and Eton since 2007 in the Southern League Premier Division.

In the summer of 2022, Williams was appointed manager of Wessex Football League side Whitchurch United F.C.

References

External links

1973 births
English footballers
Living people
Footballers from Luton
Leicester City F.C. players
Luton Town F.C. players
Colchester United F.C. players
Reading F.C. players
Bangor F.C. players
Swindon Town F.C. players
Peterborough United F.C. players
Stevenage F.C. players
Woking F.C. players
St Neots Town F.C. players
Dunstable Town F.C. players
Arlesey Town F.C. players
Windsor & Eton F.C. players
Hartley Wintney F.C. players
English Football League players
Cymru Premier players
Association football forwards